Joseph Bracken may refer to:
 Joseph A. Bracken (born 1930), American philosopher and Catholic theologian
 Joseph Kevin Bracken (1852–1904), Irish local politician, Fenian and founder of the Gaelic Athletic Association